Neogaerrhinum is a genus of the family Plantaginaceae, and is one of a group of plants commonly known as 'snapdragons'. It has two accepted species and include species formerly considered as New World members of Antirrhinum.

References

Bibliography
 Vargas P, JA Rosselló, R Oyama, J Güemes. 2004 Molecular evidence for naturalness of genera in the tribe Antirrhineae (Scrophulariaceae) and three independent evolutionary lineages from the New World and the Old. Plant Syst Evol 249:151–172.

Plantaginaceae
Plantaginaceae genera